Tag und Nacht (Day and Night) is the fourth studio album by the German electronic musician, composer and producer Christopher von Deylen under his Schiller alias. It includes collaborations with the well-known international artists Moya Brennan, Mike Oldfield and Kim Sanders.

Track listing

References

External links 
 Tag und Nacht at Discogs

2005 albums
Trance albums
Schiller (band) albums